Frisk Me Now (foaled April 2, 1994 in Florida) is an American-bred Thoroughbred racehorse a multiple Graded stakes race winner whose victories include the Flamingo Stakes, Ohio and Pennsylvania Derbys, and the Suburban, Widener, Philip H. Iselin Handicap and the Gulfstream Park Sprint Championship Handicaps.

Retired to stud, Frisk Me Now originally stood in the United States and has since been relocated to Pot. Hermosura Inc., P.R. in Puerto Rico. Frisk Me Now is the sire of Truly Frisky, Puerto Rico's 2007 Champion Imported Horse. Truly Frisky has won over $300,000 and also won the G1 Clasico Verset’s Jet twice as well as other notable stakes in Puerto Rico.

References
 Frisk Me Now's pedigree and partial racing stats at Pedigree Query

1994 racehorse births
Thoroughbred family 23-b
Racehorses bred in Florida
Racehorses trained in the United States